Sunland Boulevard is a major thoroughfare in the Crescenta and San Fernando Valleys.

Geography
Sunland Boulevard splits off of Foothill Boulevard in the Sunland area of the Crescenta Valley.  It runs for about 5 miles (8 kilometers) before changing to Vineland Avenue directly south of San Fernando Road in Sun Valley.  It also crosses intersection with Interstate 210 near its northern terminus and Interstate 5 near its southern terminus.

Transportation
Sunland Boulevard is served by Metro Local line 90.

Streets in the San Fernando Valley
Streets in Los Angeles
Streets in Los Angeles County, California
Boulevards in the United States
Sun Valley, Los Angeles